Alexander Bramble (born 13 July 1984) is a Montserratian international footballer who plays as a midfielder.

Career
Bramble made his international debut for Montserrat on 26 March 2008, in a FIFA World Cup qualifier. He has five caps to date, all of which came in FIFA World Cup qualifying matches.

References

1984 births
Living people
Montserratian footballers
Montserrat international footballers
Association football midfielders